Hopkinton High School is a public, co-educational secondary school located in Hopkinton, Massachusetts. In 2011 and 2015 it ranked in the top 100 schools on Newsweek magazine's list of "America's Best High Schools".

Demographics

Athletics
Hopkinton sports teams participate in the Massachusetts Interscholastic Athletic Association.

Notable alumni
 Edward L. Hearn (1865-1945), fifth Supreme Knight of the Knights of Columbus
 Keegan Bradley (b. 1986), American professional golfer
 Jon Curran (b. 1987), American professional golfer
 Sasha Sloan (b. 1995), American singer songwriter

References

External links
Hopkinton High School website

Schools in Middlesex County, Massachusetts
Public high schools in Massachusetts
1964 establishments in Massachusetts
Educational institutions established in 1964